Edward White (18731952) was an English landscape architect.
He was married to the daughter of Edward Milner, with whom he was partners in the firm of Milner-White & Son. He was a founder member of the Institute of Landscape Architects.

English landscape architects
1873 births
1952 deaths